"Make It wit Chu" is the third single by Queens of the Stone Age from their 2007 album Era Vulgaris.

Background
The song was originally a track on The Desert Sessions Volumes 9 & 10, entitled "I Wanna Make It wit Chu" and with PJ Harvey on backing vocals; it also appeared on the band's live DVD Over the Years and Through the Woods before being rerecorded for their fifth studio album.

"Make It wit Chu" was announced as the second German single in a newsletter from www.qotsa.de and that it would be released on three limited editions on September 28, 2007. It was also confirmed as the band's next international single as well. According to a report by the NME the B-sides for the single would be the "White Wedding" cover, previously released as a bonus track for Era Vulgaris, and a recording of "Needles in the Camel's Eye" from Brian Eno's Here Come The Warm Jets. Bobby Gillespie is reported to have been involved in the latter according to an interview with the band on SuicideGirls.

At the 2007 MTV Video Music Awards, Josh and Troy, along with Cee Lo Green (on vocals) and Dave Grohl (on drums), played the song in The Palms Casino Hotel, in one of the Fantasy Suites. This song was #60 on Rolling Stones list of the 100 Best Songs of 2007.

At the end of the song, a keyboard can be heard which starts at about 4:31. This is the same tune played during the chorus of the song Era Vulgaris, which was left off the album of the same name.

The song appears in the video game Guitar Hero 5, the documentary Warren Miller's Playground and TV show Blindspot.

Music video 
Directed by Rio Hackford, the official music video for the song surfaced in October and shows the band performing to a series of couples making out. The video was shot in Joshua Tree and also shows the legendary Rancho De La Luna, where the Desert Sessions are recorded.

The video begins with Homme driving to Rancho De La Luna and the band setting up their musical instruments. They then start to perform the song. The video shows footage of the band performing along with shots of several couples making out and talking. The band appear to be performing for the couples.

In the music video, the guitar solo is also shorter than it is on the album.

Track listings

CD
 "Make It wit Chu" (Edit) – 3:48
 "Needles in the Camel's Eye" – 3:23 (Brian Eno cover)
 "White Wedding" – 3:52 (Billy Idol cover)

 "Make It wit Chu (Video)" – 3:48

7" (EU)
 "Make It wit Chu" - 4:50
 "Needles in the Camel's Eye" - 3:23

7" Version 2
 "Make It wit Chu (Acoustic)"
 "White Wedding"

Charts

Personnel 
The Desert Sessions – Volume 9: I See You Hearin' Me
 Josh Freese – drums
 Alain Johannes – piano, rhodes, "noodles"
 Josh Homme – lead vocals, backing vocals, guitar, percussion, piano
 Dean Ween – guitar
 Brian O'Connor – bass, percussion
 PJ Harvey – backing vocals

Queens of the Stone Age – Era Vulgaris
 Josh Homme – piano, lead vocals, backing vocals, lead guitar, rhodes
 Troy Van Leeuwen – guitar, bass, backing vocals
 Joey Castillo – drums, percussion
 Alain Johannes – harmonic guitar
 Serrina Sims – backing vocals
 Brody Dalle–Homme – backing vocals
 Chris Goss – backing vocals
 Liam Lynch – backing vocals

References

External links

Queens of the Stone Age songs
2007 singles
Songs written by Josh Homme
Songs written by Dean Ween
2007 songs
Interscope Records singles
Songs written by Alain Johannes
American blues rock songs